Fasouri Watermania Waterpark is a water park located in Fasouri, a village in the municipality of Limassol, Cyprus. It is currently the biggest waterpark on the island.

Operations
In 1999, Fasouri Watermania started its operation for the first time on a 56.000 square meters land. All construction was carried out having the protection of the environment in mind at all times. All equipment has been supplied by well-known international manufacturers and no aspects of safety were left to chance. The park has gone through several expansions in 2000, 2003 and 2007. It is currently taking over 100.000 square meters (25 acres) and has a number of attractions and facilities for all ages, including 2 restaurants, 3 snack bars and 2000 sunbeds. The park is themed as a Polynesian island to provide a more tropical ambiance. Thousands of locals and tourists visit every year.

Location
Fasouri Watermania is located in the area of Fasouri Village,  about 15 minutes outside of Limassol’s city center and about 10 minutes off the Limassol-Paphos Highway.

Awards
 Awarded Europe's Leading Waterpark Attraction for the 2007 World Travel Awards.
 Carries a Certificate of Excellence from TripAdvisor.
 Awarded Traveler’s Choice Attraction for 2012, 2013, 2014 and 2016
 Awarded 3rd Best Waterpark in Europe for 2015

History
The vision of the Waterpark was born In 1998 while Fasouri Waterpark was launched in 1999 as Fasouri Watermania Waterpark. It is owned by Heaven’s Garden Waterpark Ltd, a member of the Lanitis Group of Companies. It was designed, developed and landscaped to blend harmoniously with a 105,000 square metres citrus grove garden. It is presently the biggest water park in Cyprus both in size and facilities. The park only closes due to bad weather conditions.

Attractions

 Paddle Boats
 Wet Wall Climb
 Baby Bungee Swings
 Free Fall Kamikaze Slide
 Wave Pool
 6 Lane Mat Racer
 2 Aqua Tube Slides
 Cross Over Pool
 Black Hole & Extreme Black Hole Slides
 Lazy River
 Black Cannons
 Interactive Centre
 Wet Bubble
 Probowl
 Triple Tube Slide
 2 Body Slides
 Kiddy Pool
 Swimming Pool
 Combination Shower Slide
 Kiddy Wet Bubble
 Kiddy Pool - Rainbow Splash
 Tarzan Swing

References

External links
Fasouri Watermania website
Independent Photos & Review

Tourist attractions in Cyprus
Water parks in Cyprus